This is a list of women writers who were born in Albania or whose writings are closely associated with that country.

A
Rreze Abdullahu (born 1989), Kosovo war diarist
Mimoza Ahmeti (born 1963), poet, short story writer, essayist
Valdete Antoni (born 1953), poet
Lindita Arapi (born 1972), poet, novelist, journalist, works published in German

B
Maria Antonia Braile, poet
Flora Brovina (born 1949), Kosovar-Albanian poet, journalist, women's rights activist
Klara Buda (born 1964), Albanian-American journalist, radio and television presenter

C
Selfixhe Ciu (1918–2003), novelist
Diana Culi (born 1951), novelist, short story writer, screenwriter, politician

D
Elvira Dones (born 1960), screenwriter, journalist, documentary film producer, now living in the United States
Ledia Dushi (born 1978), poet writing in Gheg Albanian

E 

 Fabiola Laco Egro (born 1963), nonfiction writer and human rights activist

G 

 Julia Gjika (born 1949), poet, now living in the United States

I 

 Anilda Ibrahimi (born 1972), novelist, now living in Italy

K
Helena Kadare (born 1943), short story writer, novelist, now living in Paris
Jolanda Kodra (1910–1963), writer and translator
Musine Kokalari (1917–1983), short story writer, first published woman writer in Albania
Mirela Kumbaro (born 1966), translator and publisher
Irma Kurti (born 1966), poet, novel and short story writer, journalist, now living in Italy

L
Natasha Lako (born 1948), poet, novelist
Luljeta Lleshanaku (born 1968), poet, magazine editor, some poetry translated into English
Masiela Lusha (born 1985), Albanian-American poet, novelist, children's writer, translator, actress, humanitarian

M 

 Kristina Gentile Mandala (1856–1919), Albanian poet and folklorist in Sicily
 Ludmilla Pajo (1947–1995), writer and journalist

S
Iliriana Sulkuqi (born 1951), Albanian-American poet, journalist

V
Ornela Vorpsi (born 1968), novelist, photographer

W 
Anila Wilms, novelist, now living in Germany

Y 
Lea Ypi (born 1979), nonfiction writer, now living in England

See also
List of Albanian writers
List of women writers

References

External links
The Situation of Women Writers in Albania by Diana Çuli

-
-
Albanian
Writers